Oleg Alekseyevich Protopopov (born 16 July 1932) is a former Russian pair skater who represented the Soviet Union. With his wife Ludmila Belousova he is a two-time Olympic champion (1964, 1968) and four-time World champion (1965–1968). In 1979, the pair defected to Switzerland and became Swiss citizens in 1995. They continued to skate at ice shows and exhibitions through their seventies.

Career 

Protopopov started skating relatively late, at age 15, and was coached by Nina Lepninskaya. In 1951, he was drafted into the Baltic Fleet but used each leave to skate. His first partner was Margarita Bogoyavlenskaya, with whom he won the silver medal at the Soviet Championships in 1953.

Protopopov met Ludmila Belousova in the spring of 1954 in Moscow. She moved to Leningrad in 1955 and began training with Protopopov in 1956 following his discharge.
The pair trained at the VSS Lokomotiv sports club and competed internationally for the USSR. They were coached initially by Igor Moskvin and then by Pyotr Orlov, but parted ways with Orlov after a number of disagreements. The pair then trained without a coach at a rink in Voskresensk, Moscow Oblast. In 1961, they decided to work with Stanislav Zhuk to raise their technical difficulty.

Belousova and Protopopov debuted at the World Championships in 1958, finishing 13th. They competed at their first Olympics two years later, placing ninth. In 1962, they made the World Championship podium for the first time, earning the silver medal. They were the first pair from the Soviet Union or Russia to win a world medal after the introduction of the pair skating discipline at the 1908 World Championships (in which only three pairs competed). Later in 1962, they won silver at the European Championships, becoming the second Soviet pair to win medals after Nina Zhuk / Stanislav Zhuk (who won silver in 1958, 1959, and 1960).

The pair's first major international gold medal came at the 1964 Winter Olympics. It was the first Olympic pairs gold for the Soviet Union. Belousova and Protopopov began the forty-year Soviet/Russian gold medal streak in pair skating, the longest in Olympic sports history, from 1964 to 2006. They won their first World and European gold medals in 1965, becoming the first Soviet/Russian pair to win those titles.

Belousova and Protopopov became Olympic champions for the second time at the 1968 Winter Olympics. At 32 and 35 years old, respectively, they were among the oldest champions in figure skating. The following season, they won the silver medal at the European Championships and bronze at the World Championships as Irina Rodnina began her reign with her first partner, Alexei Ulanov. Those were the pair's final appearances at major international competitions but they continued to compete within the Soviet Union until 1972.

In total, Belousova and Protopopov won two Olympic titles and won medals eight times at both the World and European Championships, including four consecutive World and European gold medals. After retiring from competition, they continued to skate together in shows for many years. In September 2015, they renewed their long-standing tradition of skating in a charitable exhibition in Boston, Massachusetts, at an event called "Evening with Champions".

Belousova and Protopopov contributed to the development of pair skating, including the creation of three death spirals: the backward inside (BiDs), the forward inside (FiDs), and the forward outside (FoDs), which they respectively dubbed the "Cosmic spiral", "Life spiral", and "Love spiral". Dick Button stated: "The Protopopovs are great skaters not only because they were the finest of Olympic champions, but also because their creative impact was extraordinary."

Personal life 
Protopopov was raised by his mother, a professional ballet dancer, and his stepfather, a poet. He graduated from Herzen University, faculty of physical education.

He married Ludmila Belousova in December 1957. Although Belousova kept her maiden name after their marriage, the pair are commonly referred to as "The Protopopovs". Eager to keep skating, the couple decided not to have children.

On 24 September 1979, Protopopov and Belousova defected to Switzerland while on tour and applied for political asylum. They settled in Grindelwald and eventually received Swiss citizenship in 1995. Though Switzerland remained their winter home, their summer home and training center was Lake Placid, New York. On 25 February 2003, they visited Russia for the first time after a 23-year exile, upon the invitation of Vyacheslav Fetisov. They attended the 2014 Winter Olympics in Sochi, Russia, and performed their last exhibition dance in 2016, when Protopopov was 84.

Belousova died on 29 September 2017, aged 81.

Competitive highlights 
(with Bogoyavlenskaya)

(with Belousova)

References

External links

 Pairs on Ice profile

1932 births
Living people
European Figure Skating Championships medalists
Figure skaters at the 1960 Winter Olympics
Figure skaters at the 1964 Winter Olympics
Figure skaters at the 1968 Winter Olympics
Medalists at the 1964 Winter Olympics
Olympic figure skaters of the Soviet Union
Olympic gold medalists for the Soviet Union
Olympic medalists in figure skating
Soviet defectors
Soviet emigrants to Switzerland
Soviet male pair skaters
World Figure Skating Championships medalists
Medalists at the 1968 Winter Olympics
BBC Sports Personality World Sport Star of the Year winners